Raj Hundal (Born 30 September 1981 in London) is an English-born Indian professional pool player. Hundal is most famous for winning the 2005 World Pool Masters, where he defeated Rodney Morris in the final 9–8.
Hundal also represented Europe at the 2005 Mosconi Cup,

Achievements
 2008 Quezon City Invasion 
 2005 World Pool Masters

References

External links

English pool players
Living people
English sportspeople
1981 births